Anne Marie Halvorsen   (born 12 August 1967)  is a Norwegian sport wrestler.

She won a gold medal at the 1987 World Wrestling Championships. She is also silver medalist from the European Wrestling Championships.

References

1967 births
Living people
Norwegian female sport wrestlers
World Wrestling Championships medalists
20th-century Norwegian women
21st-century Norwegian women